Prays amblystola is a moth of the  family Plutellidae. It is found in Australia.

External links
Australian Faunal Directory

Plutellidae
Moths described in 1923